|}

The Portland Handicap is a flat handicap horse race in Great Britain open to horses aged three years or older. It is run at Doncaster over a distance of 5 furlongs and 143 yards (1,137 metres), and it is scheduled to take place each year in September.

History
The event was established in 1855, and for a period it was known as the Portland Plate. The original course started opposite a coaching inn called Red House, and it featured a left-handed bend at about halfway. The race was later transferred to a straight course.

The Portland Handicap is held during Doncaster's four-day St. Leger Festival, and it is currently staged on the final day, the same day as the St Leger Stakes.

Records

Most successful horse (3 wins):
 Halmahera – 2002, 2003, 2004

Leading jockey (5 wins):
 Brownie Carslake – Irish Elegance (1919), Glanmerin (1921), Tag End (1928), Polar Bear (1932), Rosemary's Pet (1934)

Leading trainer (5 wins):
 Richard Marsh – Lollypop (1876), Marvel (1892), Kilkerran (1897), Lucknow (1900), Dieudonne (1901)

Winners since 1979
 Weights given in stones and pounds.

Earlier winners

 1855: Manganese
 1856: Lance
 1857: Meta
 1858: The Ancient Briton
 1859: Tight-fit
 1860: Tattoo
 1861: Lady Clifden
 1862: Queen of Trumps
 1863: Welland
 1864: Persuasion
 1865: Kilkenny
 1866: Skylark
 1867: Bounceaway
 1868: Lady Zetland
 1869: Argyle
 1870: Oxonian
 1871: St Vincent
 1872: Little Nell
 1873: Grand Flaneur
 1874: Genevieve
 1875: Grand Flaneur
 1876: Lollypop
 1877: Rosbach
 1878: Telescope
 1879: Hackthorpe
 1880: Discount
 1881: Mowerina
 1882: Martini
 1883: Lowland Chief
 1884: Leeds
 1885: Dalmeny
 1886: Modwena
 1887: Lisbon
 1888: Goldseeker
 1889: Galloping Queen
 1890: L'Abbesse de Jouarre
 1891: Tostig
 1892: Marvel
 1893: Whisperer
 1894: Grey Leg
 1895: Whiston
 1896: Grig
 1897: Kilkerran
 1898: Eager
 1899: Mazeppa
 1900: Lucknow
 1901: Dieudonne
 1902: Gladwin
 1903: Nabot
 1904: Santry
 1905: Xeny
 1906: Nero
 1907: Woolley
 1908: The Welkin
 1909: Americus Girl
 1910: Hallaton
 1911: Stolen Kiss
 1912: Wethers Well
 1913: Hornet's Beauty
 1914: Flying Orb
 1915–18: no race
 1919: Irish Elegance
 1920: Pelops
 1921: Glanmerin
 1922: Two Step
 1923: Polydipsia
 1924: Heverswood
 1925: Diomedes
 1926: Sunstone
 1927: Mayrian
 1928: Tag End
 1929: Tag End
 1930: Polar Bear
 1931: Xandover
 1932: Polar Bear
 1933: Valkyrie
 1934: Rosemary's Pet
 1935: Shalfleet
 1936: Shalfleet
 1937: Carissa
 1938: The Drummer
 1939–40: no race
 1941: Comatas 
 1942–45: no race
 1946: The Shah
 1947: Good View
 1948: Gold Mist
 1949: Le Lavandou
 1950: Paramount
 1951: Reminiscence
 1952: Stephen Paul
 1953: Reminiscence
 1954: Vilmoray
 1955: Princely Gift
 1956: Epaulette
 1957: Refined
 1958: Welsh Abbot
 1959: New World
 1960: Accompanist
 1961: Winna
 1962: Harmon
 1963: Marcher
 1964: Comefast
 1965: Go Shell
 1966: Audrey Joan
 1967: Florescence
 1968: Gold Pollen
 1969: Mountain Call
 1970: Virginia Boy
 1971: Royben
 1972: Privateer
 1973: Supreme Gift
 1974: Matinee
 1975: Walk By
 1976: Hei'land Jamie
 1977: Jon George
 1978: Goldhills Pride

See also
 Horse racing in Great Britain
 List of British flat horse races

References

 Paris-Turf: 

 Racing Post:
 galopp-sieger.de – Portland Handicap.
 

Flat races in Great Britain
Doncaster Racecourse
Open sprint category horse races
Recurring sporting events established in 1855
1855 establishments in England